Ex factis jus oritur (Latin: the law arises from the facts) is a principle of international law. The phrase is based on the simple notion that certain legal consequences attach to particular facts. Its rival principle is ex injuria jus non oritur in which unjust acts cannot create law.

See also 
Facts on the ground
Fait accompli
De facto
Status quo ante bellum
Revanchism
Uti possidetis

References

Brocards (law)
International law
Legal rules with Latin names